Elampini is a tribe of cuckoo wasps in the family Chrysididae.

Genera
These genera belong to the tribe Elampini:
 Elampus Spinola, 1806 g b w
 Hedychridium Abeille de Perrin, 1878 g b w
 Hedychrum Latreille, 1806 g b w
 Holophris Mocsáry, 1890 g w
 Holopyga Dahlbom, 1854 g b w
 Microchridium b
 Muesebeckidium Krombein, 1969 g b
 Omalus Panzer, 1969 b
 Parachrum Kimsey, 1988 w
 Philoctetes Abeille de Perrin, 1879 g b w
 Pseudomalus Ashmead, 1902 g b
Data sources: i = ITIS, c = Catalogue of Life, g = GBIF, b = Bugguide.net, w = WaspWeb

References

Further reading

External links

 

Chrysidinae